Osorio (also Osório) is a surname of Spanish, Portuguese and Basque origins. One meaning of the name is “hunter of wolves”. Notable people with this surname include:

Surname 
 Aitor Osorio (born 1975), Andorran swimmer
 Aldo Osorio (born 1974), Argentine footballer
 Alejandro Osorio (born 1998), Colombian cyclist
 Alejandro Osorio (footballer) (born 1976), Chilean footballer
 Alfonso Osorio (1923–2018), Spanish politician
 Amando Osório (1890–1946), Filipino poet
 Ana Elisa Osorio, Venezuelan politician
 Anthony Osorio (born 1994), Canadian soccer player
 António Horta Osório (born 1964), Portuguese banker
 António Lino de Sousa Horta Osório (born 1933), Portuguese lawyer and sportsman
 Antonio Osorio y Villegas, Spanish nobleman and soldier
 Beltrán Alfonso Osorio, 18th Duke of Alburquerque (1918–1994), Spanish peer
 Bong Osorio (1953–2020), Filipino media executive and professor
 Camila Osorio (born 2001), Colombian tennis player
 Carlos Manuel Arana Osorio (1918–2003), Guatemalan politician
 Carolina Osorio, American engineer
 Claudio Osorio (born 1958), Venezuelan entrepreneur
 Dante Osorio (born 1993), Mexican footballer
 Diego Alvarez de Osorio (1485–1536), Nicaraguan bishop
 Diego Osorio (born 1970), Colombian footballer
 Emilio Osorio, Mexican actor and singer
 Felipe Barrera-Osorio, Colombian economist
 Fernando Osorio, Colombian-Venezuelan musician
 Francisco Meneses Osorio (1630–1705), Spanish painter
 Francisco Osorio (born 1975), Colombian boxer
 Frank Osorio (born 1987), Colombian cyclist
 Gabriel Osorio Vargas, Chilean film director 
 García de Toledo Osorio, 4th Marquess of Villafranca (1514–1577), Spanish general and politician
 Georgina Osorio (born 1958), Panamanian swimmer
 Gerard Osorio (born 1993), Spanish volleyball player
 Héctor S. Osorio (1928–2016), Uruguayan professor and lichenologist
 Hernando Osorio (born 1953), Colombian painter
 Humberto Osorio (born 1988), Colombian footballer
 Isabel Osorio (1522–1589), Spanish courtier
 Ivan Osorio, American political commentator
 J Balvin, birth name José Álvaro Osorio Balvín, Colombian singer
 Jeimy Osorio, Puerto Rican actress and singer
 Jerónimo Osório (1506–1580), Portuguese bishop and historian
 Jesús Tecú Osorio (born 1971), Guatemalan activist
 Jocelyn Osorio, Chilean actress and model
 Jonathan Osorio (born 1992), Canadian soccer player
Jonathan Kamakawiwo'ole Osorio, Native Hawaiian professor
 Jorge Osorio (born 1977), Chilean football referee
 José Abílio Osório Soares (1947–2007), Indonesian politician
 Juan Osorio (born 1957), Mexican producer
 Juan Carlos Osorio (born 1961), Colombian footballer
 Juan Felipe Osorio (born 1995), Colombian cyclist
 Julio Osorio (1939–2022), Panamanian basketball player
 Juvencio Osorio (born 1950), Paraguayan footballer
 Kimberly Osorio (born 1974), American journalist and writer
 Luis Osorio (died 1496), Spanish bishop
 Magnifico Osorio (1934–1985), Filipino priest and human rights activist
 Manuel Luís Osório, Marquis of Erval (1808–1879), Brazilian military officer and politician
 Marco Osorio (born 1972), Mexican tennis player
 Marco Osório (born 1979), Portuguese footballer
 Mariano Osorio (1777–1819), Spanish general
 Miguel Ángel Osorio (disambiguation), several people
 Néstor Osorio Londoño, Colombian diplomat
 Nicholas Osorio (born 1998), Canadian soccer player
 Óscar Osorio (1910–1969), Salvadoran politician
 Pedro Colón Osorio, Puerto Rican politician
 Pedro Pablo Osorio (born 1965), Mexican footballer
 Pepón Osorio, Puerto Rican artist
 Raúl Osorio (born 1995), Chilean footballer
 Ricardo Osorio (born 1980), Mexican footballer
 Rodrigo de Castro Osorio (1523–1600), Spanish bishop
 Rodrigo Osorio (c.1968–2014), Salvadoran footballer
 Saturnino Osorio (1945–1980), Salvadoran footballer
 Sonia Osorio (1928–2011), Colombian dancer and choreographer
 Sulpicio Osório (1898–1970), Filipino editor and writer
 Tomás Luís Osório (died 1763), Portuguese colonel
 Tomás Mejías Osorio (born 1989), Spanish footballer
 Víctor Osorio (born 1984), Chilean footballer
 William Osorio (born 1971), Salvadoran footballer
 Yordan Osorio (born 1994), Venezuelan footballer

Given name 
 Osório Carvalho (born 1981), Angolan footballer
 Osorio Martínez (c. 1100–1160), Spanish magnate
 Osório Pereira (1905–1991), Brazilian rower

See also
 Osorio (disambiguation)

References 

Spanish masculine given names
Spanish-language surnames
Portuguese-language surnames